Khunurana (Aymara for a variety of potato, also spelled Cunorana, Cunurana, Jonorana, Kunurana) may refer to:

 Khunurana (Bolivia), a mountain in the Potosí Department, Bolivia
 Khunurana (Carabaya), a mountain in the Corani District, Carabaya Province, Puno Region, Peru
 Khunurana (Carabaya-Melgar), a mountain in the Carabaya Province and in the Melgar Province, Puno Region, Peru
 Khunurana (Melgar), a mountain in the Santa Rosa District, Melgar Province, Puno Region, Peru